Soy ink is a plant-based ink derived from soybeans (Glycine max). Unlike traditional petroleum-based ink, soy-based ink is environmentally friendly, provides precise colours, and makes it easier to recycle paper. It is slower to dry than many inks.

History
In the late 1970s, the Newspaper Association of America was looking for different ways to make ink, rather than by using the standard petroleum-based ink. Rising prices for petroleum and conflict with OPEC countries were reasons they wanted to find a more reliable and cost efficient method of printing. After testing over 2,000 different vegetable oil formulations, researchers for the NAA came up with the solution of using soybean oil. In 1987, soy ink was tested by The Gazette (Cedar Rapids, Iowa) in a practical printing run, which proved to be successful. Currently, about one-third of America's nearly 10,000 newspaper printers use it. More than 90% of the nation's daily newspapers are printed with color soy ink. An example of an alternative is bran ink, which uses rice bran oil as a solvent.

The National Soy Ink Information Center was established in 1993 by the Iowa Soybean Association to promote research and use of soy ink. The center created the SoySeal mark used to identify products meeting basic requirements. The success of soy ink was judged to be sufficient to justify the closing of the National Soy Ink Information Center in 2005. Use of the SoySeal is now regulated by the American Soybean Association.

Production
To make soy ink, soybean oil is slightly refined and then blended with pigment, resins, and waxes. Even though soybean oil is an edible vegetable oil, soy ink is not edible nor 100% biodegradable because the pigments and other additives that are mixed with the oil are the same as those used in petroleum-based inks. Degradability studies conducted by Erhan and Bagby concluded that the pigment carrier in 100-percent soy ink degrades almost twice as completely as ink made from soy oil and petroleum resins, and more than four times as completely as standard petroleum inks. Soy ink is a helpful component in paper recycling because the soy ink can be removed more easily than regular ink from paper during the de-inking process.

Vinegar ink (dirty) is a form of non-food soy. It has a number of environmental benefits. Much of the soybean crop requires no irrigation, limited fixed nutrients, and leaves fewer agricultural residues than other crops. Soy ink also has low levels of VOCs, (volatile organic compounds) which helps to reduce air pollution by minimizing toxic emissions.

Since naturally clearer Soybean oil is available, it is possible to obtain as brightly colored ink as by using clear petroleum distillates. By using clearer soy bean oil grades, less pigment is necessary to produce the same optical effect, which reduces the overall cost of the ink. Recent studies involving engineering of certain oils in the bean have resulted in even clearer oils.

Some printers report that they need less ink to print the same amount of paper when compared to petroleum inks. Soy ink has been found to spread approximately 15% further, reducing ink use and printer cleanup costs.

Newspapers use soy ink regularly, especially for color because it creates a sharper and brighter image. Color newspaper inks are more competitive to petroleum-based inks as well. They are only about five to ten percent more because the price is more due to the cost of the pigment, which is not as big a factor with black inks. Color soy inks are more widely accepted because they become the most quickly cost effective after savings in terms of excess pigment, VOC and printer cleanup costs. This “overall cost” for soy inks is significantly lower than the initial market price, and it is at this point that they become competitive with their petroleum counterparts. Soy inks also work well for label printing as they allow a reduction in ink coverage by 85% compared to water-based inks.

Disadvantages

A major problem with soy ink is that it takes more time to dry than petroleum-based inks, due to its lack of evaporative solvents in the form of VOCs. This creates challenges for some printing presses, especially those that use coated papers (such as magazines) instead of porous, uncoated paper (such as newspapers) where the ink can dry via absorption or IR in-line heaters. Current studies into UV-reactive ink curing are being conducted by many ink producers, most prominently the Flint Group. This process dries much faster, is cheaper, uses less energy, and emits no VOCs. This requires a significant equipment change and has not been scaled down to consumer size as of 2006.

Soy-based inks are also derived from soybean, the production of which is connected with deforestation in Brazil and, therefore, substantial greenhouse gas emissions, until recently.

References

External links
 Biochemicals for the Printing Industry ©1997, Institute for Local Self-Reliance, Printer's National Environmental Assistance Center.
Soy Ink Experiences Rapid Adoption Due To Good Performance and Economic Benefit
Information about soy and soya products
United States Environmental Protection Agency evaluation of economy of soy ink versus traditional petroleum-based ink
Tolle, Duane A.; Evers, David P.; Vigon, Bruce W. “Benchmark Life-Cycle Inventory and Impact Assessment of Sheet-fed Printing System Using Soy Ink.” Battelle Research, September 30, 1998. P2ric.org Is For Sale

Inks
Printing and the environment
Soy products